The Singapore Civil Defence Force (SCDF) is an uniformed organisation in Singapore under the Ministry of Home Affairs that provides emergency services such as firefighting, technical rescue, and emergency medical services, and coordinates national civil defence programme.

History
Singapore's first Fire Committee was formed in 1855. Prior to this, fires were attended to by uniformed groups which included the police, sepoys, marine soldiers and even convicts. On 7 September 1869, the Governor Major-General Sir Harry St. George Ord enacted the Fire Ordinance and appointed the Colonial Engineer as Chairman of the Fire Commission for Singapore. This Fire Commission was however later disbanded in 1884 due to poor organisation and difficult circumstances. In 1888, the Singapore Fire Brigade was established as a fully-equipped professional brigade with sufficient funding. By 1909, there were a total of three built stations servicing Singapore, namely Central Fire Station at Hill Street, Cross Street and Kallang Fire Stations. In 1980, the brigade was officially renamed the Singapore Fire Service (SFS).

In 1970, on the basis of elements of the SPF's Vigilante Corps, raised in the early 1960s, the Police Civil Defence Force was created under the purview of the Singapore Police Force. In 1982, the National Civil Defence Plan was launched which spearheaded the emergency preparedness for the nation at large and as a consequence of this plan majority of the SPF-VC's serving personnel joined the SPF-PCDF, which the plan designated as the nation's primary organization for civil defence and disaster response. With the enactment of the Civil Defence Act in 1986, the Singapore Civil Defence Force (SCDF), by now separate from the SPF proper, was established as an organisation under the Ministry of Home Affairs. In the same year, the Hotel New World disaster paved the way for joint operations between the SCDF and SFS. The SCDF and SFS were merged on 15 April 1989 into one organization.

The newly integrated SCDF mainly used facilities which were handed over from the Singapore Armed Forces (SAF) or the Singapore Police Force (SPF). Since the early 2000s, its headquarters and territorial divisions have all moved into purpose-built facilities. SCDF's involvement in regional disaster relief operations has also raised its profile significantly.

On 18 January 2009, SCDF was classified by INSARAG as a heavy urban search and rescue team, the highest level of urban search and rescue service.

Organisation structure
SCDF is led by the Commissioner of the SCDF and three deputy commissioners, each in charge of Strategy & Corporate Services, Operations & Resilience and Future Technology & Public Safety. The SCDF is organised with one headquarter element commanding seven divisions. Of the latter, four (1st, 2nd, 3rd, and 4th Divisions) are territorial divisions; another two are training divisions, namely the Civil Defence Academy (CDA) and National Service Training Centre (NSTC) and can be activated as the 5th and 6th Divisions respectively in times of emergency; the eighth is the Marine Division, which was set up on 1 April 2012 with the capability and capacity to respond to marine fire and rescue incidents.

Leadership

Staff departments

Operations & Resilience

Future Technology and Public Safety

Strategy and Corporate Services

Headquarters

HQ SCDF is located on Ubi Ave 4. The Central Supply Base, Operations Centre as well as Paya Lebar Fire Station are all located within the same complex with the Administration Building.

DART Central Base is also co-located within Paya Lebar Fire Station.

Operational divisions

Each territorial division is given territorial responsibility of a region of Singapore, and possesses its own command centre, hazmat capabilities, and internal administration.

Specialist units

Training divisions
The Civil Defence Academy (CDA) conducts training for the various vocations and specialisations within the SCDF, including the Section Commander Course (SCC) and Rota Commander Course (RCC).

The National Service Training Centre (NSTC) conducts training for national servicemen. It consists of the Basic Rescue Training Branch (BRTB), which conducts basic training for new enlistees in basic rescue skills and fitness, and the In-Camp Training Branch (ICTB), which trains Operationally Ready NSmen. Tucked in a corner of NSTC is the Civil Defence Detention Barracks under the purview of the SCDF Provost Unit. Detainees from both SCDF and SPF are detained here throughout the duration of their detention. Subunits of the Provost Unit are also housed here.

The Home Team Tactical Centre provides an additional training ground for trainees to experience. It replaces the Mandai Training Village which has since been demolished.

List of appliances
The SCDF maintains a large fleet of custom-made vehicles (referred to as appliances) that are capable of mitigating a variety of incidents. Many of the appliances were designed and commissioned by the SCDF rather than ready-made designs.

Paramedical response vehicles

Ambulance

The ambulance forms the backbone of Singapore's medical emergency response capability and is the most widely deployed appliance. Each ambulance is staffed by up to 2 emergency medical technicians (1 serves as a driver) and 1 paramedic. Medic trainees from the Singapore Armed Forces are also sent for attachment with these Ambulances. The latest 7th Generation ambulances comes with a self-decontamination system which is capable of decontaminating the ambulance when needed.

Medical Support Vehicle (MSV)
The Medical Support Vehicle (MSV) is a truck that is designed to provide on-site treatment capabilities for mass casualty incidents. On reaching the incident site, it is able to fold out and expand to form a mobile aid station to perform on-site stabilization and critical invasive medical treatment. In addition, MSVs are loaded with a larger inventory of medical equipment so as to manage mass-casualty incidents.

Firefighting appliances

Fire Bike
The Fire Bike, also known as the Red Scorpion, is a three-wheeled Piaggio MP3 that carries a single firefighter. They are able to navigate traffic to provide a faster initial response to emergencies. The Fire Bike carries a compressed air foam backpack which can extinguish handle smaller conflagrations such as household and vehicle fires. It is also equipped with an automated external defibrillator to respond to medical emergencies in concert with an ambulance.

Light Fire Attack Vehicle (LFAV)

The Light Fire Attack Vehicle (LFAV), also known as the Red Rhino, was first introduced in 2000. It is designed to be more compact than a traditional fire engine, allowing it to be stationed at a larger variety of locations.

The most recent iteration is the 6th generation, unveiled in 2022 at the SCDF Workplan Seminar. Instead of the traditional 4-man crew in the previous LFAV generations, the 6th generation carries a robot named the Red Rhino Robot (3R) which fits in the rear passenger compartment. The 3R conducts reconnaissance operations to locate the seat of fire through the use of thermal imaging and relay the information to the operator, who can then direct firefighting operations. The robot is able to mitigate a fire within confines of approximately 15m2.

Pump Ladder (PL)

The Pump Ladder (PL) is the workhorse fire engine of the SCDF. It carries 2,400 litres of water and 1,200 litres of foam, along with other rescue and firefighting equipment. The PL is also equipped to set up hasty decontamination facilities for a chemical incident. The decontamination lanes can be set up within four minutes, and each lane is able to decontaminate up to 36 walking casualties or six lying casualties per hour. The Generation E of the PL features a compress air foam pump.

Combined Platform-Ladder (CPL)

The Combined Platform-Ladder (CPL) is a hydraulic ladder-platform truck which is used to conduct external firefighting and rescue operations involving high-rise buildings. There are several variants of CPL in SCDF, the largest being the CPL60 which can extend its platform ladder up to a maximum height of 60 metres, the equivalent of a 20-storey building. Its platform is equipped with a water monitor capable of discharging water at the rate of 3,800 litres per minute, and a rescue cage that can hold up to 500 kg.

Aerial Ladder (AL) 
The Aerial Ladder (AL) is a ladder truck used in the SCDF for aerial firefighting and rescue. It has an operational height of 56 metres.

Fire and Rescue Operations Support Tender (FROST)

The Fire and Rescue Operations Support Tender (FROST) is a support appliance that provides additional sets of self-contained breathing apparatus, thermal imaging cameras, gas detectors and smoke and water extraction functions to facilitate difficult or prolonged rescue operations.

It was designed to consolidate the functions of the previous Breathing Apparatus Tender (BAT) and Damage Control Tender (DCT), halving the total manpower needed for these functions from eight to four.

Tracked Firefighting Vehicle (TFV)

The Tracked Firefighting Vehicle (TFV) is a Bandvagn 206 that is used in forested areas where wheeled vehicles may have difficulty navigating. These vehicles were transferred from the Singapore Armed Forces to the SCDF and subsequently repainted and fitted with firefighting equipment and capabilities.

Modular Oil Tank Firefighting System (MOTFS)
The Modular Oil Tank Fire-Fighting System (MOTFS) is an oil tank fire fighting system capable of discharging large volumes of foam for large-scale fires, up to 100,000 litres per minute. It is also capable of drafting water supply directly from open sources such as the sea or marine vessels. It is also designed in a modular form to speed up deployment to match the scale of the incident.

Unmanned Firefighting Machine (UFM)
The Unmanned Firefighting Machine (UFM) is a remote controlled fire-fighting unit built to operate in extreme heat and hazardous environments, by using high velocity airflow to create ventilation in smoke-logged areas, and intense water mist, jet or foam to put out fires. It was first launched in April 2014. In 2015, the UFM added a rail kit to enable the unit to manoeuvre in Mass Rapid Transit tunnels at up to 40 km/h to put out fires and conduct ventilation operations.

Pumper Firefighting Machine
The custom-built Pumper Firefighting Machine can traverse up and down a staircase, fit into passenger lifts and penetrate through premises with a maximum temperature of 250-degree Celsius for up to 10 minutes. Other unique features include a rotating nozzle that can project water mist in 360-degree angles to quickly lower room temperatures and a high pressure hose reel with a built-in water tank that can allow firefighters to quickly initiate firefighting operations at incidents. Its resistance to heat also means that firefighters will be less exposed to risk during firefighting operations.

Hazmat appliances

Hazmat Mitigation Vehicle
The Hazmat Mitigation Vehicle (HMV) is a hazardous materials apparatus that transports Hazmat personnel and their equipment to an incident site. The HMV carries a Hazmat Utility Buggy (HUB) in the rear of the appliance, where it can be unloaded to assess incident developments, transport equipment and convey casualties out of the hazard area.

Hazmat Decon Pod
The Hazmat Decon Pod conducts environmental decontamination by sucking in contaminated air and purifying it at a high rate to remove hazardous material and render an area more hospitable for work following a chemical, biological, radiological and nuclear incident.

Mass Decontamination Vehicle (MDV)
The Mass Decontamination Vehicle (MDV) is a large bus that is able to transport personnel and equipment, perform the decontamination of a large number casualties, and convey the casualties to the hospital.

Hazmat Control Vehicle
The Hazmat Control Vehicle carries a chemical detector to detect and monitor chemical release from up to 5 km away. It is also fitted with a launchpad for unmanned aerial vehicles to extend the range and altitude of its chemical detection capabilities.

Command elements

Command Vehicle (CV) and Forward Command Vehicle (FCV) 
The Command Vehicle (CV) functions as a mobile headquarters command and control centre. The vehicles are the size of a large bus, and when deployed, the body of the vehicle stretches to thrice its size on the road, allowing ample space inside the vehicle for personnel and essential computer and communications equipment. CVs are deployed to strategic locations to provide forward tactical headquarters capability in major incidents or high-risk events.

Hazmat Command Vehicle (HCV)
The Hazmat Command Vehicle (HCV) is a command post specifically designed for command and control during a CBR incident. It is equipped for this task with a wide array of instruments and sensors which can, for example, monitor and help predict toxic material presence and dispersion in the wind.

Special vehicles

DART Rescue Vehicle (DRV)
The DART Rescue Vehicle (DRV) is a specialised appliance of the Disaster Assistance and Rescue Team designed for urban search and rescue. It carries a personnel cabin and can accommodate up to eight DART officers with their equipment. The DRV is equipped with a crane with a load capacity of 7.9 tonnes. It is primarily used to load other rescue vehicles like the DART skid loader, which is used to access confined spaces in collapsed buildings.

Fireboats

In 2012, the Singapore Civil Defence Force took over responsibility from the Maritime Port Authority for fighting maritime fires. By 2019, the SCDF Marine Division had retired some old fireboats, and added six new modern vessels, bringing the size of the firefighting fleet to eight vessels. One of the new vessels, the Red Sailfish, is the most powerful fireboat in the world so far.

Operation Lionheart
SCDF maintains a rescue contingent on 24-hour standby under the codename Operation Lionheart to provide rescue and humanitarian assistance and support to countries stricken by major disasters. Since its formation in 1990, the Operation Lionheart contingent had responded to multiple overseas missions.

Below is the breakdown of the missions:

Ranks 
Officers

Warrant officers

Other ranks

In popular culture
Fictional television programs:
 Fiery Passion (烈焰焚情), 12 February 1992
 On the Frontline (穿梭生死线), 2000
 Cemas, an 2001 malay drama
 Life Line, 2005
 Without Warning, 26 October 2006
 Life Line 2, 15 May 2007
 Rescue 995 (九九五), 6 February 2012
 In Safe Hands (守护星), 7 March 2022
Crimewatch Singapore, 1986

Incidents

Misconduct 
On 19 December 2011, former commissioner Peter Lim Sin Pang was arrested on graft charges in connection with an IT contract. Lim was dismissed from service in August 2013. He was sentenced to jail for six months.

On 13 May 2018, full-time national serviceman Corporal Kok Yuen Chin drowned in a fire station's pump well during a ragging incident when his colleagues attempted to celebrate his transition to an operationally ready reservist. Those involved were arrested, charged in court and jailed. Two of them have been dismissed from service.

Fatalities 
On 9 December 2022, full-time national serviceman Corporal Edward H Go (Chinese: 吴宏泽; pinyin: Wú Hóngzé) fell unconscious during a firefighting operation at a residential building in Bukit Merah; he was later pronounced dead in hospital. Reported by the press as being the first SCDF member to have died during an operation, Go was posthumously promoted to Sergeant(1) and granted a ceremonial funeral.

SCDF Commissioner Eric Yap paid tribute to Sgt (1) Edward Go on his ceremonial funeral and said in his speech that he offered condolences to Sgt (1) Go’s family, loved ones and friends, adding that his death has also hit those in the SCDF hard. "We will remember Sgt Edward’s selflessness, professionalism and commitment. For those of us who knew him personally, they will remember how proud he was to be a firefighter,” the commissioner added further.

See also
 Civil defence by nation
 Civil Defence Auxiliary Unit
 Compulsory Fire Service
 National Service in Singapore
 National Civil Defence Cadet Corps
 SAMU, an equivalent organisation in France

References
Citations

Bibliography

 Joan Hon (1988). 100 Years of the Singapore Fire Service. Times Books International. .

External links
 

1982 establishments in Singapore
Emergency services in Singapore
Fire departments
Organisations of the Singapore Government